Count Adolf of Nassau-Siegen (8 August 1586 – 7 November 1608), official titles: Graf zu Nassau, Katzenelnbogen, Vianden und Diez, Herr zu Beilstein, was a count from the House of Nassau-Siegen, a cadet branch of the Ottonian Line of the House of Nassau. He served as an officer in the Dutch States Army. In the propaganda for the House of Orange, he is regarded as one of the twelve heroes of the House of Nassau who gave their lives in the Eighty Years’ War for the freedom of the Dutch people.

Biography
Adolf was born at Dillenburg Castle on 8 August 1586 as the third son of Count John VII ‘the Middle’ of Nassau-Siegen and his first wife, Countess Magdalene of Waldeck-Wildungen. He was baptised on Sunday 21 AugustJul..

Adolf studied in Geneva in 1601, and then in Basel and in France. He entered the Dutch States Army in 1604 and took part in the Siege of Ostend (1604) and the Siege of Sluis (1604). On 3 April 1606 he was appointed ritmeester over a company of 86 horsemen. In 1608 he was with his father in the Palatinate. He then undertook an expedition to Luxembourg and was killed on the retreat on 7 November 1608 near Xanten. He was buried on 23 November 1608 in the Saint Stephen’s Church in Nijmegen.

Adolf and his older brothers John Ernest and John ‘the Younger’ had the reputation of being gamblers and of showing a completely unseemly splendour in their clothes and appearance. Their father wrote letters to the young counts, full of fatherly admonitions, exhorting them to be thrifty, because he did not know what to do with his worries and debts. In a letter of 8 December 1608 he even considered the death of Adolf as a punishment from God and he exhorted the two others, who with ‘einem ärgerlichen Leben mit Verschwendung fast allem, was ich in der Welt habe, durch Ehebrechen und Hurerei, Plünderung und Beraubung armer, unschuldiger Leute hoch und niederen Standen’ (‘an annoying life of squandering almost everything I have in the world, through adultery and fornication, plundering and robbing poor, innocent people of high and low rank’) ruined the county of Nassau-Siegen, to lead a different, better life, worthy of the name Nassau.

In 1901, on the initiative of municipal archivist H.D.J. van Schevichaven, a plaque measuring 103 by 64 cm was affixed to the northern transept of St. Stephen’s Church in Nijmegen. The text on this plaque reads (translated into English):

“IN THE MONTH OF NOVEMBER 1608
WAS BURIED HERE
ADOLF COUNT OF NASSAU SIEGEN
THIRD SON OF JOHN COUNT OF NASSAU SIEGEN
AND OF MAGDALENE OF WALDECK
FALLEN AT THE AGE OF 22
IN A BATTLE NEAR XANTEN
HE WAS ONE OF THE TWELVE HEROES
FROM THE HOUSE OF NASSAU
WHO IN THE EIGHTY YEARS’ WAR
GAVE THEIR LIVES FOR THE FREEDOM
OF THE DUTCH PEOPLE”

Ancestors

References

Sources
 
 
  (1911). "Adolf, de Jonge". In:  en  (redactie), Nieuw Nederlandsch Biografisch Woordenboek (in Dutch). Vol. Eerste deel. Leiden: A.W. Sijthoff. p. 1222.
 
 
 
 
 
 
 
 
  (1979). "Genealogische gegevens". In:  (red.), Nassau en Oranje in de Nederlandse geschiedenis (in Dutch). Alphen aan den Rijn: A.W. Sijthoff. p. 40–44, 224–228. .
 
  (1882). Het vorstenhuis Oranje-Nassau. Van de vroegste tijden tot heden (in Dutch). Leiden: A.W. Sijthoff/Utrecht: J.L. Beijers.

External links

 Nassau. In: Medieval Lands. A prosopography of medieval European noble and royal families, compiled by Charles Cawley.
 Nassau Part 5. In: An Online Gotha, by Paul Theroff.

1586 births
1608 deaths
German Calvinist and Reformed Christians
German military officers
German people of the Eighty Years' War
Adolf
Military personnel of the Eighty Years' War
People from Dillenburg
16th-century German people
17th-century German military personnel